"Puttin' On the Ritz" is a song written by Irving Berlin. He wrote it in May 1927 and first published it on December 2, 1929. It was registered as an unpublished song August 24, 1927 and again on July 27, 1928. It was introduced by Harry Richman and chorus in the musical film Puttin' On the Ritz (1930). According to The Complete Lyrics of Irving Berlin, this was the first song in film to be sung by an interracial ensemble. The title derives from the slang expression "to put on the Ritz", meaning to dress very fashionably. This expression was in turn inspired by the opulent Ritz Hotel in London.

Hit phonograph records of the tune in its original period of popularity of 1929–1930 were recorded by Harry Richman and by Fred Astaire, with whom the song is particularly associated.  Every other record label had their own version of this popular song (Columbia, Brunswick, Victor, and all of the dime store labels). Richman's Brunswick version of the song became the number-one selling record in America.

The song received renewed popularity in 1982 when Taco, a Dutch musician, recorded and released a new version of the song. Taco's version was accompanied by a music video, which aired on MTV and other music video networks and programs.

Kenny Yarbrough also recorded a cover of the song; this version was used as theme music for the short-lived 1991 sitcom Top of the Heap.

Musical structure
The song is in AABA form, with a verse. According to John Mueller, the central device in the A section is the "use of delayed rhythmic resolution: a staggering, off-balance passage, emphasized by the unorthodox stresses in the lyric, suddenly resolves satisfyingly on a held note, followed by the forceful assertion of the title phrase." The marchlike B section, which is only barely syncopated, acts as a contrast to the previous rhythmic complexities. According to Alec Wilder, in his study of American popular song, for him, the rhythmic pattern in "Puttin' On the Ritz" is "the most complex and provocative I have ever come upon."

Lyrics

The original version of Berlin's song included references to the then-popular fad of flashily dressed but poor black Harlemites parading up and down Lenox Avenue, "Spending ev'ry dime / For a wonderful time". In the United Kingdom, the song was popularized through the BBC's radio broadcasts of Joe Kaye's Band performing it at The Ritz Hotel, London restaurant in the 1930s. The song was featured with the original lyrics in the 1939 film Idiot's Delight, where it was performed by Clark Gable and chorus, and this routine was selected for inclusion in That's Entertainment (1974). Columbia released a 78 recording of Fred Astaire singing the original lyrics in May 1930 (B-side – "Crazy Feet", both recorded on March 26, 1930). For the film Blue Skies (1946), where it was performed by Fred Astaire, Berlin revised the lyrics to apply to affluent whites strutting "up and down Park Avenue". This second version was published after being registered for copyright on August 28, 1946.

Taco version

In 1982, singer Taco released a synth-pop cover version of "Puttin' On the Ritz" as a single from his album After Eight, released in Europe on Polydor and by RCA in the US. The single was accompanied by a music video, the original version of which contains characters in blackface and has since been banned from many networks. An alternative version eliminates many shots of the blackface characters, though some remain.

The cover also musically references other Irving Berlin songs, such as "Always," "There's No Business Like Show Business," "Alexander's Ragtime Band," and "White Christmas." "Broadway Rhythm" from Broadway Melody of 1936 is also referenced.

The single was a global hit, reaching No. 1 on Cash Box as well as No. 4 on the Billboard Hot 100 chart, making Irving Berlin, then 95, the oldest ever living songwriter to have one of his compositions enter the top ten. It was certified gold by the RIAA for selling over one million copies. It was Taco's only hit in the United States. This version of the song was ranked No. 53 in VH1's 100 Greatest One Hit Wonders of the 80s special.

The song topped the charts in Sweden and New Zealand, and entered the top 5 in numerous countries including Australia, Norway, Austria, and Canada.

Chart history

Weekly singles charts

Year-end charts

Certifications

See also
Puttin' On the Ritz, a 1930 musical film directed by Edward Sloman, featuring the song
Young Frankenstein, a 1974 American comedy horror film directed by Mel Brooks in which the song becomes the basis of a musical dance number featuring Frederick Frankenstein and the Monster

References

Notes

Citations

Bibliography

Songs about theatre
Songs about dancing
1929 songs
1930 singles
1982 singles
Songs written by Irving Berlin
Fred Astaire songs
Cashbox number-one singles
Number-one singles in New Zealand
Number-one singles in Sweden
United States National Recording Registry recordings
RCA Records singles
Music video controversies
Taco (musician) songs